Katherine (Katie) Rainsberger (born August 18, 1998) is an American long distance runner from Colorado. Her mother is former distance star Lisa Larsen (Weidenbach) Rainsberger. She was also a swimmer who qualified for the Olympic team trials in 1980, though the U.S. boycotted the games. Lisa was a top-ranked long distance runner during most of the 1980s. She won the Boston Marathon in 1985, the last American woman to do so until Desiree Linden's win in 2018. Katie's father, Ellis, played football at Kansas State University. Lisa switched to the triathlon not long before Katie was born.

Early life 
Katie played soccer for her first two years in high school, and in 2012, was the MVP of the state club soccer tournament, before focusing entirely on track, where her mother coached her. She was a 4.5 GPA student at the Air Academy High School in Colorado Springs. Her brother, Ian, is three years younger than she. The tall speedster won 10 state titles in cross country and track and field in 2015-16, swept the 800, 1,600 and 3,200 meters at the 2016 Colorado state meet for the second straight season and was undefeated at distance as a senior. She recorded the fifth fastest ever prep mile time, 4:40.92, to earn 2015 Track and Field News All-America honors, then clocked the 6th fastest all-time high school time in the 1,500 meters at the 2016 Portland Track Festival, where she ran 4:12.62. She led the Nike Nationals cross-country in 16:56.8, was the national Gatorade U.S. Cross Country Runner of the Year, and set the U.S. high school females 5k cross country record at 16:23.5, until it was broken by Katelyn Tuohy in 2018. While in high school she set her personal outdoor bests for the mile of 4:40.92 on June 13, 2015, and nine months later at The Armory indoors, in 4:36.61, both in New York, NY. In 2015 she had the U.S. yearly high school best for 800 Meters, 2:08.87. In 2016, she duplicated that feat with a 1,600 Meters in 4:44.31 and 3,200 Meters in 10:23.24.

Shortly after graduating from high school, she ran 3000 Meters in 9:00.62 at Bydgoszcz, Poland on July 20, 2016.

College years 
Katie ran for the University of Oregon for her Freshman and Sophomore years, recording bests of 800 meters in 2:05.20, at the Oregon State University High Performance Meet, in Corvallis, Oregon, 1500 Meters in 4:09.08, in Portland, Oregon on June 16, 2017, the mile in 4:35.6 at the MPSF Championships, and 16:13.53 for 5000 Meters while finishing third at the Pac-12 Championships in Eugene, Oregon on May 14, 2017. She earned first-team all-American honors in the 1,500 meters when she took fourth at the NCAA Championships with a time of 4:14.20. She earned all-America honors placing third in the 3,000m in 9:09.87 and was a member of the third-place Distance Medley Relay team at the NCAA Indoor Championships. Her team won, breaking the collegiate record in the distance medley relay (10:48.8) at the Columbia East/West Challenge. She bettered her PR for 3,000 meters clocking 9:01.2 at the Husky Classic. She led her Oregon team to the 2016 NCAA title as a freshman with her fourth-place finish at the NCAA Championships, in 19:51.1, earning all-America status. She also finished second for the Ducks and 11th overall at the NCAA West Regionals, in 19:52.5, and was the top freshman in the Pac-12 Championships, finishing fifth overall with a time of 20:30.6 She was named Pac-12 freshman of the year as well as first-team all-Pac-12. She had finished first for Oregon, sixth overall, at the 2016 ISU Pre-National Invitational with a time of 20:19.1 and finished second in 19:42.90, in her Oregon debut at the Washington Invitational. In 2017-18, she again became an all-American, was named to the first-team all-Pac-12 selection, and led Oregon in every meet throughout the season, earning top-five finishes four times and top-20 finishes in every meet. She also earned all-American honors with a 16th place finish at the NCAA Championships in 19:50.6. She was Oregon's first finisher, fifth overall in 19:30.9, at the NCAA West Regional, after having finished first for Oregon and second overall in 18:58.5 at the Pac-12 Championships, earning first-team honors for the second consecutive year. At the Bill Dellinger Invitational, she demolished the previous course record by 37 seconds in 18:47.6, leading Oregon to a 1-2-3 finish. In her 2018 outdoor season, the five-time All American suffered a delayed-diagnosis, partially-torn, achilles tendon, leading to what were for her, sub-par performances, yet she continued to compete through the season.

With other Oregon distance runners, she then transferred to the University of Washington in the fall of 2018 in order to remain with their coaches, Andy and Maurica Powell.

References 

1998 births
Living people
American female long-distance runners
Sportspeople from Colorado Springs, Colorado
Track and field athletes from Colorado
Washington Huskies women's track and field athletes